The X Factor is a British television music competition to find new singing talent. The fourteenth series began airing on ITV on 2 September 2017, presented by Dermot O'Leary. For the first time in seven years, the judging panel remained the same as the previous series, with Nicole Scherzinger, Simon Cowell, Sharon Osbourne and Louis Walsh returning. This is the first series not to include companion show The Xtra Factor, after it was cancelled in January 2017. Its replacement is a programme called Xtra Bites presented by Becca Dudley on the ITV Hub. This is also the first series to be sponsored by Just Eat, with the show having been sponsored by TalkTalk since 2009, as well as the second time the show has premiered in September, rather than August, since the first series in 2004. Rak-Su won the competition on 3 December 2017 and they became the second group to win the competition and Simon Cowell became the winning mentor for the fourth time.

Judges and presenters

In December 2016, Louis Walsh confirmed he would continue to judge the series through 2018, stating he had signed through "the next two years". That same month, both Sharon Osbourne and Nicole Scherzinger cast doubt on their return, with Osbourne citing her dual-work on The Talk, and Scherzinger stating: "I can't confirm that I'm going to [be back] but I think if I did return it would have to be with this panel because I'm really close with this panel. [...] I've really enjoyed myself and we're really close." On 13 April 2017, Cowell announced his intentions to retain the same judging panel for the fourteenth series. In June 2017, it was announced that the judging panel would remain the same as the previous series.

Dermot O'Leary returned for his tenth series as presenter. On 23 June 2017, it was announced that Britain's Got Talent judge Alesha Dixon would appear as a guest judge for the first day of Manchester auditions, due to Scherzinger having a "previous diary commitment". Five days later, on 28 June, it was announced that Dixon would once again appear as a guest judge, this time for Osbourne, who was unavailable due to a long-standing back injury. Cowell arrived late to the London auditions on 4 July 2017, due to an illness. On 29 October 2017, Dixon reappeared as a guest judge on the Sunday live show, this time filling in for Cowell, who was absent recovering from an injury during the weekend.

Selection process
On 4 July, it was reported that there would be major changes to the show this year. Auditions were taking place in Thorpe Park, bootcamp would take place in front of an audience and there would be six weeks of live shows instead of the usual ten. Additionally, acts would be sent home on both Saturday and Sunday, as "tedious" Saturday nights received lower viewing figures than Sunday.

Auditions
The minimum age to audition this year was 14 after being reduced down from 16 the previous year. Contestants needed a "yes" from at least three of the four judges to progress to Bootcamp.

Mobile auditions
The mobile auditions began on 11 May 2017, in Belfast and concluded on 23 May 2017, in Yeovil.

Judges' auditions
The auditions began on 20 June 2017, in Liverpool and concluded on 10 July 2017, in Surrey.

Bootcamp
Bootcamp was filmed live at The SSE Arena, Wembley in front of a studio audience. Following the filming of bootcamp and prior to the filming of the six-chair challenge, the judges' categories were revealed. Cowell was given the Groups, Scherzinger was given the Over 28s, Osbourne was given the Girls and Walsh was given the Boys. There are two different stages to Bootcamp: Wall of Songs, where a list of 35 songs appeared on a wall 4 times, and the four acts who pick the same song would perform it together, and the judges would decide instantly who would make to the 2nd stage of bootcamp: the Boot camp audition, in front of the judges and a live audience, where after an act performance the judges will instantly decide whether or not they'll make it through to the 6-Chair Challenge. The categories were all revealed in Wembley Stadium, and revealed on TV on 7 October.

Six-chair challenge
The six-chair challenge took place over the course of three days, from 26 to 28 July 2017, at The SSE Arena, Wembley. Unlike previous years, where all four judges sat together, each judge was secluded on their own while their respective category performed. The three remaining judges sat together and gave their own critiques of the performance, before allowing the category's judge to make the final decision. It was broadcast over three episodes; Osbourne choosing in the first, Cowell and Scherzinger choosing in the second, with later portions of her decisions shown, alongside Walsh's, in the third.

Judges' houses
The judges' categories were announced in July 2017, with additional details of the judges' houses announced in October 2017. Anthony Russell withdrew after the pre-recorded sections of the show and was replaced by Sam Black who was knocked out of the competition at the Bootcamp stage. Black was in Walsh's Boys category. In a statement, Walsh stated, "Anthony has been fantastic across the series, a great singer and performer who we are really sad to see go. I had to think for a long time who could take the place. Sam had a great reaction from the British public when his Audition aired. So I re-watched it and realised we missed a trick not putting him through at Boot Camp. He has that retro 60s style viewers will love. He's really likeable and talented and I can't wait to hear more." At the end of judges' houses, it was announced that the public could vote for a wildcard from each category bringing the total number of contestants for the live shows to 16.

Acts 

Key:
 – Winner
 – Runner-Up
 – Wildcard (Live Shows)

Live shows
The contestants for the live shows were announced during the episode broadcast on 22 October 2017. However, at the end of the episode, a wildcard vote for each category was announced by O’Leary. The winners of the wildcard vote were revealed on 28 October at the start of the first live show.

For the first time since series six, a major overhaul of the set layout was made as live shows debuted in a new filming location, LH2 Studios in London, following the closure of Fountain Studios. Numerous other changes were introduced for this series' live shows. This included contestant and musical guest performances on both Saturday and Sunday shows, and the removal of the final showdowns, deadlocks and judges' votes on the Sunday show. Each show, two of the categories would sing and immediately after the performances, the public vote would open for a short amount of time. At the end of each show, the contestant with the fewest votes is automatically eliminated from the competition. In addition, the contestant with the highest votes for that night would also be announced. The two acts who won their respective public vote would then sing against each other in a new element of the show called the prize fight. After another public vote, the winner of the prize fight would win a special weekly prize. For the first time ever the live final was broadcast from the Excel Centre, London and not Wembley Arena as part of the show's drastic changes this series.

Musical guests
Liam Payne performed on the first live show, while Stormzy performed on the second live show. Tokio Myers performed on the third live show, while Rita Ora performed on the fourth. Harry Styles performed on the fifth live show and Paloma Faith performed on the sixth. Matt Terry performed on the seventh live show and Fergie performed on the eighth. James Arthur performed on the first semi-final and Ed Sheeran performed on the second. PrettyMuch and Louis Tomlinson performed on Saturday's final, while Pink, Sam Smith, CNCO and Little Mix performed during the Sunday final.

Results summary

Colour key

 The voting percentages in week 6 for Sunday do not add up to 100%, owing to the freezing of votes. Kevin Davy White received 8.2% of the final vote.

Live show details

Week 1 (28/29 October)
 Theme: "Express Yourself"
 Prize: Trip to New York City, meet and greet with Pink at Madison Square Garden
 Musical guests:
 Saturday: Liam Payne ("Bedroom Floor")
 Sunday: Stormzy & MNEK ("Blinded by Your Grace, Pt. 2")

The wildcards were revealed at the start of Saturday's show.

Cowell missed this week's show, due to recovery from falling down the stairs the morning before. Alesha Dixon filled in as a guest judge on Sunday.

Week 2 (4/5 November)
 Theme: "Viva Latino"
 Prize: Recording session with a Grammy awarded producer
 Musical guests:
 Saturday: Tokio Myers ("Angel")
 Sunday: Rita Ora ("Anywhere")

Week 3 (11/12 November)
 Theme: "George Michael"
 Prize: Open for Little Mix at Manchester Arena on 21 November 2017
 Musical guests:
 Saturday: Harry Styles ("Kiwi")
 Sunday: Paloma Faith ("Guilty")

Week 4: Quarter-Final (18/19 November)
 Theme: "Crazy in Love"
 Prize: Record own song with Ali Tamposi
 Musical guests:
 Saturday: Matt Terry ("The Thing About Love")
 Sunday: Fergie ("Save It Til Morning")

Week 5: Semi-Final (25/26 November)
O'Leary confirmed that there would be no Prize Fight from this week onwards and all the categories would perform on the same night for the first time this series.

25 November
 Theme: "Cool Britannia"
 Musical guest: James Arthur ("Naked")

26 November
Theme: "Get Me to the Final"
Musical guest: Ed Sheeran ("Perfect")

Week 6: Final (2/3 December)
O’Leary revealed on 2 December that the winners' single this year would be the contestants' duet.

2 December
 Theme: "No theme"; "Celebrity duets/Winner's single"
 Musical guests: Pete Tong & Heritage Orchestra featuring Becky Hill ("Sing It Back"/ "You've Got the Love") (with Grace Davies, Rak-Su & Kevin Davy White), PrettyMuch ("No More") and Louis Tomlinson ("Miss You")

Kevin Davy White received the fewest public votes and was automatically eliminated.

3 December
Theme: "Song to win", "Song of the Series"
Musical guests: Little Mix & CNCO ("Power"/"Reggaetón Lento (Remix)"), Pink ("Beautiful Trauma"/"What About Us"), and Sam Smith ("One Last Song")

Winner's single
All proceeds from the winner's single are in aid of children's hospice charities, Together for Short Lives and Shooting Star Chase. Simco Limited will donate 100% of its profits from the sale of each download and in respect of all audio streaming of the single, and the Chancellor has also agreed to donate the VAT, in each case to be shared equally by the charities. This donation will be at least 20p plus VAT for each download sold in the UK. FremantleMedia, ITV and all performers featuring on the single have also agreed to forgo any master royalties due to them in connection with downloads and all audio streaming of the single.

Reception

Ratings

 The ratings over a 28-day period, including the broadcasts on ITV and streaming through ITV Hub.
 The ratings over a 28-day period, including the broadcasts on ITV, ITV HD and streaming through ITV Hub.
 The ratings over a 28-day period, including the broadcasts on ITV, ITV HD, ITV+1 and streaming through ITV Hub.
 The rank for the combined ITV, ITV HD and ITV+1 broadcasts, compared with all channels for that week, from Monday to Sunday.

References

External links

2017 British television seasons
2017 in British music
 14
United Kingdom 14